is the ninth major single by Japanese band Perfume. It was released on March 25, 2009 as a CD-only version and CD+DVD version. The single reached number one on the Oricon weekly chart on April 1. The limited edition CD+DVD version included a form that, when filled out and sent in, entered fans into a draw for prizes such as a backstage pass, a visit at home by Perfume, "Perfume Original Goods" gifts, and T-shirts.

Background and release
The A-side "One Room Disco" is a mid-to-fast tempo composition containing elements of electro, bubblegum pop and disco. The song was announced to be "a spring-like, dancable song". It features a filtered bass guitar. Some phrases in the song refer to some classic songs, such as "Video Killed the Radio Star" by The Buggles, and "Give Me Up" by Michael Fortunati. Lyrically, One Room Disco is about the expectations and anxieties of a new life in a new town during spring, which is the season where one typically graduates, enters the work force, or moves in Japan.

The B-side "23:30" is a lounge-influenced track featuring drums and a synthesized harp. It uses elements of shibuya-kei, chiptune and bossa nova.

Reception
The single sold 77,325 copies on its first day and 99,825 copies in its first week. By the end of 2009, the single sold 101,016 copies.

Track listing

CD

DVD

Charts

Certifications

References 

2009 songs
Perfume (Japanese band) songs
Songs written by Yasutaka Nakata
Oricon Weekly number-one singles
Billboard Japan Hot 100 number-one singles
Song recordings produced by Yasutaka Nakata